The 50th United States Congress was a meeting of the legislative branch of the United States federal government, consisting of the United States Senate and the United States House of Representatives. It met in Washington, D.C. from March 4, 1887, to March 4, 1889, during the third and fourth years of Grover Cleveland's first presidency. The president vetoed 212 pieces of legislation, the greatest number in a single session of Congress.

The apportionment of seats in the House of Representatives was based on the 1880 United States census. The Senate had a Republican majority, and the House had a Democratic majority.

Major events

Major legislation

 October 8, 1888: Chinese Exclusion Act (Scott Act)
 January 14, 1889: Nelson Act of 1889
 February 22, 1889: Enabling Act of 1889, Sess. 2, ch. 180,

Party summary
The count below identifies party affiliations at the beginning of the first session of this Congress, and includes members from vacancies and newly admitted states, when they were first seated. Changes resulting from subsequent replacements are shown below in the "Changes in membership" section.

Senate

House of Representatives

Leadership

Senate 
 President: Vacant
 President pro tempore: John J. Ingalls (R)
 Republican Conference Chairman: George F. Edmunds
 Democratic Caucus Chairman: James B. Beck

House of Representatives 
 Speaker: John G. Carlisle (D)
 Minority Leader: Thomas B. Reed
 Democratic Caucus Chairman: Samuel S. Cox
 Republican Conference Chairman: Joseph Gurney Cannon
 Democratic Campaign Committee Chairman: John E. Kenna

Members

Skip to House of Representatives, below

Senate
Senators were elected by the state legislatures every two years, with one-third beginning new six-year terms with each Congress. Preceding the names in the list below are Senate class numbers, which indicate the cycle of their election. In this Congress, Class 1 meant their term began in this Congress, requiring reelection in 1892; Class 2 meant their term ended in this Congress, requiring reelection in 1888; and Class 3 meant their term began in the last Congress, requiring reelection in 1890.

Alabama 
 2. John T. Morgan (D)
 3. James L. Pugh (D)

Arkansas 
 2. James H. Berry (D)
 3. James K. Jones (D)

California 
 1. George Hearst (D)
 3. Leland Stanford (R)

Colorado 
 2. Thomas M. Bowen (R)
 3. Henry M. Teller (R)

Connecticut 
 1. Joseph R. Hawley (R)
 3. Orville H. Platt (R)

Delaware 
 1. George Gray (D)
 2. Eli M. Saulsbury (D)

Florida 
 1. Samuel Pasco (D), from May 19, 1887
 3. Wilkinson Call (D)

Georgia 
 2. Alfred H. Colquitt (D)
 3. Joseph E. Brown (D)

Illinois 
 2. Shelby M. Cullom (R)
 3. Charles B. Farwell (R)

Indiana 
 1. David Turpie (D)
 3. Daniel W. Voorhees (D)

Iowa 
 2. James F. Wilson (R)
 3. William B. Allison (R)

Kansas 
 2. Preston B. Plumb (R)
 3. John J. Ingalls (R)

Kentucky 
 2. James B. Beck (D)
 3. Joseph C. S. Blackburn (D)

Louisiana 
 2. Randall L. Gibson (D)
 3. James B. Eustis (D)

Maine 
 1. Eugene Hale (R)
 2. William P. Frye (R)

Maryland 
 1. Arthur Pue Gorman (D)
 3. Ephraim K. Wilson (D)

Massachusetts 
 1. Henry L. Dawes (R)
 2. George F. Hoar (R)

Michigan 
 1. Francis B. Stockbridge (R)
 2. Thomas W. Palmer (R)

Minnesota 
 1. Cushman K. Davis (R)
 2. Dwight M. Sabin (R)

Mississippi 
 1. James Z. George (D)
 2. Edward C. Walthall (D)

Missouri 
 1. Francis M. Cockrell (D)
 3. George G. Vest (D)

Nebraska 
 1. Algernon S. Paddock (R)
 2. Charles F. Manderson (R)

Nevada 
 1. William M. Stewart (R)
 3. John P. Jones (R)

New Hampshire 
 2. Person C. Cheney (R), until June 14, 1887
 William E. Chandler (R), from June 14, 1887
 3. Henry W. Blair (R)

New Jersey 
 1. Rufus Blodgett (D)
 2. John R. McPherson (D)

New York 
 1. Frank Hiscock (R)
 3. William M. Evarts (R)

North Carolina 
 2. Matt W. Ransom (D)
 3. Zebulon B. Vance (D)

Ohio 
 1. John Sherman (R)
 3. Henry B. Payne (D)

Oregon 
 2. Joseph N. Dolph (R)
 3. John H. Mitchell (R)

Pennsylvania 
 1. Matthew S. Quay (R)
 3. J. Donald Cameron (R)

Rhode Island 
 1. Nelson W. Aldrich (R)
 2. Jonathan Chace (R)

South Carolina 
 2. Matthew C. Butler (D)
 3. Wade Hampton III (D)

Tennessee 
 1. William B. Bate (D)
 2. Isham G. Harris (D)

Texas 
 1. John H. Reagan (D)
 2. Richard Coke (D)

Vermont 
 1. George F. Edmunds (R)
 3. Justin S. Morrill (R)

Virginia 
 1. John W. Daniel (D)
 2. Harrison H. Riddleberger (RA)

West Virginia 
 1. Charles J. Faulkner (D), from May 5, 1887
 2. John E. Kenna (D)

Wisconsin 
 1. Philetus Sawyer (R)
 3. John C. Spooner (R)

House of Representatives
The names of members of the House of Representatives are preceded by their district numbers.

Alabama 
 . James T. Jones (D)
 . Hilary A. Herbert (D)
 . William C. Oates (D)
 . Alexander C. Davidson (D)
 . James E. Cobb (D)
 . John H. Bankhead (D)
 . William H. Forney (D)
 . Joseph Wheeler (D)

Arkansas 
 . Poindexter Dunn (D)
 . Clifton R. Breckinridge (D)
 . Thomas C. McRae (D)
 . John H. Rogers (D)
 . Samuel W. Peel (D)

California 
 . Thomas L. Thompson (D)
 . Marion Biggs (D)
 . Joseph McKenna (R)
 . William W. Morrow (R)
 . Charles N. Felton (R)
 . William Vandever (R)

Colorado 
 . George G. Symes (R)

Connecticut 
 . Robert J. Vance (D)
 . Carlos French (D)
 . Charles A. Russell (R)
 . Miles T. Granger (D)

Delaware 
 . John B. Penington (D)

Florida 
 . Robert H. M. Davidson (D)
 . Charles Dougherty (D)

Georgia 
 . Thomas M. Norwood (D)
 . Henry G. Turner (D)
 . Charles F. Crisp (D)
 . Thomas W. Grimes (D)
 . John D. Stewart (D)
 . James H. Blount (D)
 . Judson C. Clements (D)
 . Henry H. Carlton (D)
 . Allen D. Candler (D)
 . George T. Barnes (D)

Illinois 
 . Ransom W. Dunham (R)
 . Frank Lawler (D)
 . William E. Mason (R)
 . George E. Adams (R)
 . Albert J. Hopkins (R)
 . Robert R. Hitt (R)
 . Thomas J. Henderson (R)
 . Ralph Plumb (R)
 . Lewis E. Payson (R)
 . Philip S. Post (R)
 . William H. Gest (R)
 . George A. Anderson (D)
 . William M. Springer (D)
 . Jonathan H. Rowell (R)
 . Joseph G. Cannon (R)
 . Silas Z. Landes (D)
 . Edward Lane (D)
 . Jehu Baker (R)
 . Richard W. Townshend (D)
 . John R. Thomas (R)

Indiana 
 . Alvin P. Hovey (R), until January 17, 1889
 Francis B. Posey (R), from January 29, 1889
 . John H. O'Neall (D)
 . Jonas G. Howard (D)
 . William S. Holman (D)
 . Courtland C. Matson (D)
 . Thomas M. Browne (R)
 . William D. Bynum (D)
 . James T. Johnston (R)
 . Joseph B. Cheadle (R)
 . William D. Owen (R)
 . George W. Steele (R)
 . James B. White (R)
 . Benjamin F. Shively (D)

Iowa 
 . John H. Gear (R)
 . Walter I. Hayes (D)
 . David B. Henderson (R)
 . William E. Fuller (R)
 . Daniel Kerr (R)
 . James B. Weaver (GB)
 . Edwin H. Conger (R)
 . Albert R. Anderson (IR)
 . Joseph Lyman (R)
 . Adoniram J. Holmes (R)
 . Isaac S. Struble (R)

Kansas 
 . Edmund N. Morrill (R)
 . Edward H. Funston (R)
 . Bishop W. Perkins (R)
 . Thomas Ryan (R)
 . John A. Anderson (IR)
 . Erastus J. Turner (R)
 . Samuel R. Peters (R)

Kentucky 
 . William J. Stone (D)
 . Polk Laffoon (D)
 . W. Godfrey Hunter (R)
 . Alexander B. Montgomery (D)
 . Asher G. Caruth (D)
 . John G. Carlisle (D)
 . William C. P. Breckinridge (D)
 . James B. McCreary (D)
 . George M. Thomas (R)
 . William P. Taulbee (D)
 . Hugh F. Finley (R)

Louisiana 
 . Theodore S. Wilkinson (D)
 . Matthew D. Lagan (D)
 . Edward J. Gay (D)
 . Newton C. Blanchard (D)
 . Cherubusco Newton (D)
 . Edward W. Robertson (D), until August 2, 1887
 Samuel M. Robertson (D), from December 5, 1887

Maine 
 . Thomas B. Reed (R)
 . Nelson Dingley Jr. (R)
 . Seth L. Milliken (R)
 . Charles A. Boutelle (R)

Maryland 
 . Charles H. Gibson (D)
 . Frank T. Shaw (D)
 . Henry W. Rusk (D)
 . Isidor Rayner (D)
 . Barnes Compton (D)
 . Louis E. McComas (R)

Massachusetts 
 . Robert T. Davis (R)
 . John D. Long (R)
 . Leopold Morse (D)
 . Patrick A. Collins (D)
 . Edward D. Hayden (R)
 . Henry Cabot Lodge (R)
 . William Cogswell (R)
 . Charles H. Allen (R)
 . Edward Burnett (D)
 . John E. Russell (D)
 . William Whiting (R)
 . Francis W. Rockwell (R)

Michigan 
 . J. Logan Chipman (D)
 . Edward P. Allen (R)
 . James O'Donnell (R)
 . Julius C. Burrows (R)
 . Melbourne H. Ford (D)
 . Mark S. Brewer (R)
 . Justin R. Whiting (D)
 . Timothy E. Tarsney (D)
 . Byron M. Cutcheon (R)
 . Spencer O. Fisher (D)
 . Seth C. Moffatt (R), until December 22, 1887 
 Henry W. Seymour (R), from February 14, 1888

Minnesota 
 . Thomas Wilson (D)
 . John Lind (R)
 . John L. MacDonald (D)
 . Edmund Rice (D)
 . Knute Nelson (R)

Mississippi 
 . John M. Allen (D)
 . James B. Morgan (D)
 . Thomas C. Catchings (D)
 . Frederick G. Barry (D)
 . Chapman L. Anderson (D)
 . Thomas R. Stockdale (D)
 . Charles E. Hooker (D)

Missouri 
 . William H. Hatch (D)
 . Charles H. Mansur (D)
 . Alexander M. Dockery (D)
 . James N. Burnes (D), until January 23, 1889
 Charles F. Booher (D), from February 19, 1889
 . William Warner (R)
 . John T. Heard (D)
 . John E. Hutton (D)
 . John J. O'Neill (D)
 . John M. Glover (D)
 . Martin L. Clardy (D)
 . Richard P. Bland (D)
 . William J. Stone (D)
 . William H. Wade (R)
 . James P. Walker (D)

Nebraska 
 . John A. McShane (D)
 . James Laird (R)
 . George W. E. Dorsey (R)

Nevada 
 . William Woodburn (R)

New Hampshire 
 . Luther F. McKinney (D)
 . Jacob H. Gallinger (R)

New Jersey 
 . George Hires (R)
 . James Buchanan (R)
 . John Kean Jr. (R)
 . James N. Pidcock (D)
 . William W. Phelps (R)
 . Herman Lehlbach (R)
 . William McAdoo (D)

New York 
 . Perry Belmont (D), until December 1, 1888
 . Felix Campbell (D)
 . Stephen V. White (R)
 . Peter P. Mahoney (D)
 . Archibald M. Bliss (D)
 . Amos J. Cummings (D)
 . Lloyd S. Bryce (D)
 . Timothy J. Campbell (D)
 . Samuel S. Cox (D)
 . Francis B. Spinola (D)
 . Truman A. Merriman (D)
 . W. Bourke Cockran (D)
 . Ashbel P. Fitch (D)
 . William G. Stahlnecker (D)
 . Henry Bacon (D)
 . John H. Ketcham (R)
 . Stephen T. Hopkins (R)
 . Edward W. Greenman (D)
 . Nicholas T. Kane (D), until September 14, 1887
 Charles Tracey (D), from November 8, 1887
 . George West (R)
 . John H. Moffitt (R)
 . Abraham X. Parker (R)
 . James S. Sherman (R)
 . David Wilber (R)
 . James J. Belden (R), from November 8, 1887
 . Milton De Lano (R)
 . Newton W. Nutting (R)
 . Thomas S. Flood (R)
 . Ira Davenport (R)
 . Charles S. Baker (R)
 . John G. Sawyer (R)
 . John M. Farquhar (R)
 . John B. Weber (R)
 . William G. Laidlaw (R)

North Carolina 
 . Louis C. Latham (D)
 . Furnifold McLendel Simmons (D)
 . Charles W. McClammy (D)
 . John Nichols (I)
 . John M. Brower (R)
 . Alfred Rowland (D)
 . John S. Henderson (D)
 . William H. H. Cowles (D)
 . Thomas D. Johnston (D)

Ohio 
 . Benjamin Butterworth (R)
 . Charles E. Brown (R)
 . Elihu S. Williams (R)
 . Samuel S. Yoder (D)
 . George E. Seney (D)
 . Melvin M. Boothman (R)
 . James E. Campbell (D)
 . Robert P. Kennedy (R)
 . William C. Cooper (R)
 . Jacob Romeis (R)
 . Albert C. Thompson (R)
 . Jacob J. Pugsley (R)
 . Joseph H. Outhwaite (D)
 . Charles P. Wickham (R)
 . Charles H. Grosvenor (R)
 . Beriah Wilkins (D)
 . Joseph D. Taylor (R)
 . William McKinley (R)
 . Ezra B. Taylor (R)
 . George W. Crouse (R)
 . Martin A. Foran (D)

Oregon 
 . Binger Hermann (R)

Pennsylvania 
 . Henry H. Bingham (R)
 . Charles O'Neill (R)
 . Samuel J. Randall (D)
 . William D. Kelley (R)
 . Alfred C. Harmer (R)
 . Smedley Darlington (R)
 . Robert M. Yardley (R)
 . Daniel Ermentrout (D)
 . John A. Hiestand (R)
 . William H. Sowden (D)
 . Charles R. Buckalew (D)
 . John Lynch (D)
 . Charles N. Brumm (R)
 . Franklin Bound (R)
 . Frank C. Bunnell (R)
 . Henry C. McCormick (R)
 . Edward Scull (R)
 . Louis E. Atkinson (R)
 . Levi Maish (D)
 . John Patton (R)
 . Welty McCullogh (R)
 . John Dalzell (R)
 . Thomas M. Bayne (R)
 . Oscar L. Jackson (R)
 . James T. Maffett (R)
 . Norman Hall (D)
 . William L. Scott (D)
 . Edwin S. Osborne (R)

Rhode Island 
 . Henry J. Spooner (R)
 . Warren O. Arnold (R)

South Carolina 
 . Samuel Dibble (D)
 . George D. Tillman (D)
 . James S. Cothran (D)
 . William H. Perry (D)
 . John J. Hemphill (D)
 . George W. Dargan (D)
 . William Elliott (D)

Tennessee 
 . Roderick R. Butler (R)
 . Leonidas C. Houk (R)
 . John R. Neal (D)
 . Benton McMillin (D)
 . James D. Richardson (D)
 . Joseph E. Washington (D)
 . Washington C. Whitthorne (D)
 . Benjamin A. Enloe (D)
 . Presley T. Glass (D)
 . James Phelan Jr. (D)

Texas 
 . Charles Stewart (D)
 . John H. Reagan (D), until March 4, 1887
 William H. Martin (D), from November 4, 1887
 . Constantine B. Kilgore (D)
 . David B. Culberson (D)
 . Silas Hare (D)
 . Joseph Abbott (D)
 . William H. Crain (D)
 . Littleton W. Moore (D)
 . Roger Q. Mills (D)
 . Joseph D. Sayers (D)
 . Samuel W. T. Lanham (D)

Vermont 
 . John W. Stewart (R)
 . William W. Grout (R)

Virginia 
 . Thomas H. B. Browne (R)
 . George E. Bowden (R)
 . George D. Wise (D)
 . William E. Gaines (R)
 . John R. Brown (R)
 . Samuel I. Hopkins (L)
 . Charles T. O'Ferrall (D)
 . William H. F. Lee (D)
 . Henry Bowen (R)
 . Jacob Yost (R)

West Virginia 
 . Nathan Goff (R)
 . William L. Wilson (D)
 . Charles P. Snyder (D)
 . Charles E. Hogg (D)

Wisconsin 
 . Lucien B. Caswell (R)
 . Richard W. Guenther (R)
 . Robert M. La Follette (R)
 . Henry Smith (L)
 . Thomas R. Hudd (D)
 . Charles B. Clark (R)
 . Ormsby B. Thomas (R)
 . Nils P. Haugen (R)
 . Isaac Stephenson (R)

Non-voting members 
 . Marcus A. Smith (D)
 . Oscar S. Gifford (R)
 . Fred T. Dubois (R)
 . Joseph K. Toole (D)
 . Antonio Joseph (D)
 . John T. Caine (D)
 . Charles S. Voorhees (D)
 . Joseph M. Carey (R)

Changes in membership
The count below reflects changes from the beginning of this Congress.

Senate 
 Replacements: 1
 Democratic: no net change
 Republican: no net change
 Liberal Republican: 1 seat net loss
 Deaths: 0
 Resignations: 1
 Interim appointments: 1
Total seats with changes: 2

House of Representatives 
 Replacements: 8
 Democratic: no net change
 Republican: no net change
 Deaths: 4
 Resignations: 5
 Contested election: 0
Total seats with changes: 8

Committees

Senate

 Additional Accommodations for the Library of Congress (Select) (Chairman: Daniel W. Voorhees; Ranking Member: Justin S. Morrill)
 Agriculture and Forestry (Chairman: Thomas W. Palmer; Ranking Member: James Z. George)
 Appropriations (Chairman: William B. Allison; Ranking Member: James B. Beck)
 Audit and Control the Contingent Expenses of the Senate (Chairman: John P. Jones; Ranking Member: Zebulon B. Vance)
 Canadian Relations (Select) (Chairman: George F. Hoar; Ranking Member: N/A)
 Census (Chairman: Eugene Hale; Ranking Member: James H. Berry)
 Centennial of the Constitution and the Discovery of America (Select) (Chairman: Frank Hiscock; Ranking Member: Daniel W. Voorhees)
 Civil Service and Retrenchment (Chairman: Jonathan Chace; Ranking Member: Daniel W. Voorhees)
 Civil Service Operations (Special) (Chairman: William E. Chandler; Ranking Member: Joseph Clay Stiles Blackburn)
 Claims (Chairman: John C. Spooner; Ranking Member: James K. Jones)
 Coast Defenses (Chairman: Joseph N. Dolph; Ranking Member: John R. McPherson)
 Commerce (Chairman: William P. Frye; Ranking Member: Matt W. Ransom)
 Distributing Public Revenue Among the States (Select)
 District of Columbia (Chairman: John J. Ingalls; Ranking Member: Isham G. Harris)
 Education and Labor (Chairman: Henry W. Blair; Ranking Member: William B. Allison)
 Engrossed Bills (Chairman: Eli Saulsbury; Ranking Member: William B. Allison)
 Enrolled Bills (Chairman: Thomas M. Bowen; Ranking Member: Alfred H. Colquitt)
 Epidemic Diseases (Select) (Chairman: Isham G. Harris; Ranking Member: Eugene Hale)
 Examine the Several Branches in the Civil Service (Chairman: Matthew S. Quay; Ranking Member: Wade Hampton)

 Executive Departments Methods (Select) (Chairman: Matthew C. Butler; Ranking Member: Orville H. Platt)
 Expenditures of Public Money (Chairman: Charles B. Farwell; Ranking Member: William P. Frye)
 Finance (Chairman: Justin S. Morrill; Ranking Member: Daniel W. Voorhees)
 Fisheries (Chairman: John Sherman; Ranking Member: Wade Hampton)
 Foreign Relations (Chairman: Algernon S. Paddock; Ranking Member: John T. Morgan) 
 Fishing Bounties and Allowances (Select)
 Five Civilized Tribes of Indians (Select) (Chairman: Matthew C. Butler; Ranking Member: J. Donald Cameron)
 Government Printing Office (Select)
 Indian Affairs (Chairman: Henry L. Dawes; Ranking Member: Isham G. Harris)
 Indian Traders (Select) (Chairman: William E. Chandler; Ranking Member: Joseph C.S. Blackburn)
 Interstate Commerce (Chairman: Shelby M. Cullom; Ranking Member: Isham G. Harris)
 Irrigation and Reclamation of Arid Lands (Select)
 Judiciary (Chairman: George F. Edmunds; Ranking Member: James L. Pugh) 
 Library (Chairman: William M. Evarts; Ranking Member: Daniel W. Voorhees)
 Manufactures (Chairman: Harrison H. Riddleberger; Ranking Member: Alfred H. Colquitt)
 Military Affairs (Chairman: Joseph R. Hawley; Ranking Member: Francis M. Cockrell)
 Mines and Mining (Chairman: William M. Stewart; Ranking Member: William B. Bate)
 Mississippi River and its Tributaries (Select) (Chairman: Algernon S. Paddock; Ranking Member: James B. Eustis)
 Naval Affairs (Chairman: J. Donald Cameron; Ranking Member: John R. McPherson)
 Nicaraguan Claims (Select) (Chairman: John Tyler Morgan; Ranking Member: George F. Hoard)
 Pacific Railway Commission (Special) (Chairman: William P. Frye; Ranking Member: John T. Morgan)

 Patents (Chairman: Henry M. Teller; Ranking Member: James K. Jones)
 Pensions (Chairman: Cushman K. Davis; Ranking Member: Ephraim K. Wilson)
 Post Office and Post Roads (Chairman: Philetus Sawyer; Ranking Member: Eli Saulsbury)
 Potomac River Front (Select) (Chairman: John R. McPherson; Ranking Member: N/A)
 Printing (Chairman: Charles F. Manderson; Ranking Member: Arthur P. Gorman)
 Private Land Claims (Chairman: Matt W. Ransom; Ranking Member: George F. Edmonds)
 Privileges and Elections (Chairman: George F. Hoar; Ranking Member: Eli Saulsbury)
 Public Buildings and Grounds (Chairman: Leland Stanford; Ranking Member: George G. Vest)
 Public Lands (Chairman: Preston B. Plumb; Ranking Member: John T. Morgan)
 Railroads (Chairman: Dwight M. Sabin; Ranking Member: Francis B. Stockbridge)
 Revision of the Laws (Chairman: James F. Wilson; Ranking Member: Ephraim K. Wilson)
 Revolutionary Claims (Chairman: Richard Coke; Ranking Member: Jonathan Chace)
 Rules (Chairman: Nelson W. Aldrich; Ranking Member: Isham G. Harris)
 Tariff Regulation (Select)
 Territories (Chairman: Orville H. Platt; Ranking Member: Matthew C. Butler)
 Transportation and Sale of Meat Products (Select) (Chairman: George G. Vest; Ranking Member: N/A)
 Transportation Routes to the Seaboard (Chairman: John H. Mitchell; Ranking Member: Randall L. Gibson)
 Whole
 Woman Suffrage  (Select) (Chairman: Francis M. Cockrell; Ranking Member: Thomas W. Palmer)

House of Representatives

 Accounts (Chairman: Frank T. Shaw; Ranking Member: James O'Donnell)
 Agriculture (Chairman: William H. Hatch; Ranking Member: Justin R. Whiting)
 Alcoholic Liquor Traffic (Select) (Chairman: James E. Campbell; Ranking Member: N/A)
 American Ship building (Select)
 Appropriations (Chairman: Samuel J. Randall; Ranking Member: Edmund Rice)
 Banking and Currency (Chairman: Beriah Wilkins; Ranking Member: Luther F. McKinney)
 Claims (Chairman: S. W. T. Lanham; Ranking Member: John Lynch)
 Coinage, Weights and Measures (Chairman: Richard P. Bland; Ranking Member: Norman Hall)
 Commerce (Chairman: Martin L. Clardy; Ranking Member: James Phelan Jr.)
 District of Columbia (Chairman: John J. Hemphill; Ranking Member: Robert J. Vance)
 Education (Chairman: Allen D. Candler; Ranking Member: John B. Penington)
 Elections (Chairman: Charles F. Crisp; Ranking Member: Littleton W. Moore)
 Enrolled Bills (Chairman: Spencer O. Fisher; Ranking Member: Constantine B. Kilgore)
 Expenditures in the Interior Department (Chairman: Thomas R. Hudd; Ranking Member: Charles N. Brumm)
 Expenditures in the Justice Department (Chairman: William H. H. Cowles; Ranking Member: Albert C. Thompson)
 Expenditures in the Navy Department (Chairman: William L. Scott; Ranking Member: Jacob Romeis)
 Expenditures in the Post Office Department (Chairman: Alexander M. Dockery; Ranking Member: Charles E. Brown)
 Expenditures in the State Department (Chairman: Leopold Morse; Ranking Member: Louis E. Atkinson)
 Expenditures in the Treasury Department (Chairman: Joseph Wheeler; Ranking Member: John M. Farquhar)
 Expenditures in the War Department (Chairman: Polk Laffoon; Ranking Member: William Warner)
 Expenditures on Public Buildings (Chairman: Timothy J. Campbell; Ranking Member: Seth L. Milliken)
 Foreign Affairs (Chairman: James B. McCreary; Ranking Member: James S. Cothran)
 Indian Affairs (Chairman: Samuel W. Peel; Ranking Member: Silas Hare)
 Invalid Pensions (Chairman: Courtland C. Matson; Ranking Member: Thomas L. Thompson)
 Judiciary (Chairman: David B. Culberson; Ranking Member: John D. Stewart) 
 Labor (Chairman: John J. O'Neill; Ranking Member: Edward Burnett) 
 Levees and Improvements of the Mississippi River (Chairman: Thomas C. Catchings; Ranking Member: Samuel M. Robertson)
 Library (Chairman: William G. Stahlnecker; Ranking Member: Charles O'Neill)
 Manufactures (Chairman: Henry Bacon; Ranking Member: Frank C. Bunnell)
 Merchant Marine and Fisheries (Chairman: Poindexter Dunn; Ranking Member: John L. MacDonald)
 Mileage (Chairman: John H. Rogers; Ranking Member: James J. Belden)
 Military Affairs (Chairman: Richard W. Townshend; Ranking Member: Samuel S. Yoder)
 Militia (Chairman: William McAdoo; Ranking Member: Francis B. Spinola)
 Mines and Mining (Chairman: Charles T. O'Ferrall; Ranking Member: Marion Biggs)
 Naval Affairs (Chairman: Hilary A. Herbert; Ranking Member: Joseph Abbott)
 Pacific Railroads (Chairman: Joseph H. Outhwaite; Ranking Member: Miles T. Granger)
 Patents (Chairman: James B. Weaver; Ranking Member: Robert J. Vance)
 Pensions (Chairman: Archibald M. Bliss; Ranking Member: John E. Russell)
 Printing (Chairman: James D. Richardson; Ranking Member: John A. Hiestand)
 Private Land Claims (Chairman: John M. Glover; Ranking Member: Louis C. Latham)
 Post Office and Post Roads (Chairman: James H. Blount; Ranking Member: Alfred Rowland)
 Public Buildings and Grounds (Chairman: Samuel Dibble; Ranking Member: Charles E. Hogg)
 Public Lands (Chairman: William S. Holman; Ranking Member: John L. MacDonald)
 Railways and Canals (Chairman: Robert H. M. Davidson; Ranking Member: Henry H. Carlton)
 Revision of Laws (Chairman: William C. Oates; Ranking Member: Charles E. Hogg)
 Rivers and Harbors (Chairman: Newton C. Blanchard; Ranking Member: Thomas L. Thompson)
 Rules (Chairman: John G. Carlisle; Ranking Member: Thomas B. Reed)
 Standards of Official Conduct
 Territories (Chairman: William M. Springer; Ranking Member: Melbourne H. Ford)
 War Claims (Chairman: William J. Stone; Ranking Member: Theodore S. Wilkinson)
 Ways and Means (Chairman: Roger Q. Mills; Ranking Member: William D. Bynum)
 Whole

Joint committees

 Conditions of Indian Tribes (Special)
 Disposition of (Useless) Executive Papers
 To Investigate Work on the Washington Aqueduct Tunnel
 The Library (Chairman: William G. Stahlnecker; Vice Chairman: Charles O'Neill)
 Printing

Caucuses
 Democratic (House)
 Democratic (Senate)

Administrative officers

Legislative branch agency directors
 Architect of the Capitol: Edward Clark
 Librarian of Congress: Ainsworth Rand Spofford 
 Public Printer of the United States: Thomas E. Benedict

Senate 
 Chaplain: John G. Butler (Lutheran)
 Secretary: Anson G. McCook
 Librarian: Alonzo M. Church
 Sergeant at Arms: William P. Canady

House of Representatives 
 Chaplain: William H. Milburn (Methodist)
 Clerk: John B. Clark Jr.
 Doorkeeper: Alvin B. Hurt, elected December 5, 1887
 Clerk at the Speaker's Table: Nathaniel T. Crutchfield
 Postmaster: Lycurgus Dalton
 Reading Clerks: Thomas S. Pettit (D) and Neill S. Brown Jr. (R)
 Sergeant at Arms: John P. Leedom

See also 
 1886 United States elections (elections leading to this Congress)
 1886–87 United States Senate elections
 1886 United States House of Representatives elections
 1888 United States elections (elections during this Congress, leading to the next Congress)
 1888 United States presidential election
 1888–89 United States Senate elections
 1888 United States House of Representatives elections

Notes

References

External links
 Biographical Directory of the U.S. Congress
 U.S. House of Representatives: House History
 U.S. Senate: Statistics and Lists